Hair of the Dog is the sixth studio album by the Scottish hard rock band Nazareth, released on 3 April 1975. The album was recorded at Escape Studios, Kent,  with additional recording and mixing at AIR Studios, London, and is the group’s best known and highest selling release, with over two million copies sold worldwide.

After three albums with Deep Purple's Roger Glover producing, Manny Charlton stepped into that position, one he filled for several subsequent albums.

Background
Hair of The Dog was Nazareth's first big hit album (aside from the minor success of Razamanaz), including classics such as the title track, a version of The Everly Brothers' "Love Hurts" (on the US version, but not the Canadian/European, it replaced the original "Guilty"), "Beggars Day" and  "Please Don't Judas Me".

According to Nazareth frontman Dan McCafferty, the track on Hair of the Dog in which a dishonest young woman finally meets her match provided the original album title with its recognizable chorus of “now you’re messing with a… a son of a bitch!” (an “heir of the dog”). Nazareth’s record label wasn’t about to let them name the project Son of a Bitch. Thus, Hair of the Dog was selected as a compromise, putting the finishing touches on a career-defining release.
The album title is often considered to be a shortened form of the phrase describing a folk hangover cure, “the hair of the dog that bit you”.

The album was first reissued on CD in the USA in 1984; the disc was manufactured in Japan with the inserts printed in Japan. There are also remastered editions released since 1997 with different sets of bonus tracks. The name of the creature on the album cover is unknown.

The album cover art was designed by David Fairbrother-Roe.

Track listing
All songs written by Manny Charlton, Dan McCafferty, Pete Agnew, Darrell Sweet, except where noted.

The remastered editions include both "Guilty" (track 3) and "Love Hurts" (track 8) plus the following bonus tracks:

1997 Castle Communications / Essential

2001 30th Anniversary Edition

2010 Salvo Records Remaster

 BBC live recordings recorded at Paris Theatre. First transmission date: 27 November 1975
 The song "Hair of the Dog" was also covered by Guns N' Roses on their album The Spaghetti Incident? in 1993, and by Britny Fox on their album Boys in Heat in 1989.

Personnel 

Band members
Dan McCafferty – lead vocals and backing vocals, talk box on "Hair of the Dog"
Manny Charlton – electric guitar and synthesizer
Pete Agnew – bass and backing vocals
Darrell Sweet – drums, tambourine and backing vocals

Additional musicians
Max Middleton – piano on "Guilty"
Simon Phillips - tabla on "Please Don't Judas Me"
Vicki Brown, Liza Strike, Barry St. John – backing vocals on "Guilty"
 Vicky Silva – backing vocals on "Please Don't Judas Me"

Charts

Certifications

References

Nazareth (band) albums
1975 albums
Vertigo Records albums
A&M Records albums
Mooncrest Records albums
Albums with cover art by Hipgnosis